Robert Turnbull may refer to:

 Bob Turnbull (1894–1946), Scottish footballer
 Bobby Turnbull (1895–1952), English footballer
 Robert Turnbull (American politician) (1850–1920), U.S. Representative from Virginia
 Robert Turnbull (Australian politician) (c. 1819–1872), member of the Victorian Legislative Council
 Robert Turnbull (railway manager) (1852–1925), general manager and director of the LNWR
 Robert James Turnbull (1775–1833), South Carolina planter and nullification advocate